Paint Creek State Park is a  public recreation area located in Highland and Ross counties in the U.S. state of Ohio. The state park's central feature is a reservoir,  Paint Creek Lake, which was created by the damming of Paint Creek. Construction on the dam started in 1967, and Paint Creek State Park was opened in 1972.

The underlying geology of the park is limestone, and significant limestone bluffs may be seen, and hiked to, just below the dam. The bluffs and gorges feature Coolwort (Sullivantia), an extremely rare wildflower in Ohio. as well as an outstanding colony of Smooth Cliffbrake (Pellaea glabella) ferns.

The Highlands Nature Sancuary, a private,  nature reserve, is contiguous with the park.

Gallery

References

External links

Paint Creek State Park Ohio Department of Natural Resources
Paint Creek State Park Map Ohio Department of Natural Resources

State parks of Ohio
Protected areas of Highland County, Ohio
Protected areas of Ross County, Ohio
Protected areas established in 1972
1972 establishments in Ohio
Nature centers in Ohio